The Majestic is a 2001 American romantic drama film directed and produced by Frank Darabont, written by Michael Sloane, and starring Jim Carrey in the lead role. The film also features Bob Balaban, Brent Briscoe, Jeffrey DeMunn, Amanda Detmer, Allen Garfield, Hal Holbrook, Laurie Holden, Martin Landau, Ron Rifkin, David Ogden Stiers, and James Whitmore. The film depicts a 1950s Hollywood screenwriter suspected of being a communist. After suffering amnesia as the result of a road accident, he is taken in by the residents of a small town, who mistake him for a local resident who went MIA while serving in the military during World War II.

Carrey's performance was a significant departure from his previous work, which until then had mostly been comedy films. The film premiered on December 11, 2001, and was released in the United States on December 21, 2001. It received lukewarm reviews from critics and grossed $37 million worldwide against a budget of $72 million, losing an estimated $49 million.

Plot
In 1951, in the heyday of McCarthyism, Peter Appleton is an up-and-coming young screenwriter in Hollywood. He learns from studio lawyer Leo Kubelsky and his own attorney Kevin Bannerman that he has been accused of being a communist, because he attended an antiwar meeting in his college years, a meeting he claims he only attended to impress a girl.

In an instant, Peter's new film, Ashes to Ashes, is pushed back for a few months, the credit is given to someone else, his movie star girlfriend Sandra Sinclair leaves him, and his contract with the studio is dropped. Peter gets drunk and goes for a drive up the California coast, where he accidentally drives his car off a bridge to avoid an opossum.

He regains consciousness on an ocean beach, experiencing amnesia. Peter is found by Stan Keller, who helps him to the nearby town of Lawson, California, and the local doctor, Doc Stanton, tends to his wounds. As the town welcomes him, Harry Trimble arrives and believes Peter to be his son Luke, who went missing in action (MIA) during World War II, sometime after D-Day. Due to his amnesia, Peter accepts being treated as Luke by the town, led by Mayor Ernie Cole. Peter warms to the town, including getting to know Harry and Doc Stanton's daughter, Adele; 9 1/2 years earlier, they had become engaged the night before he went to war.

Peter adjusts to his new life and helps to renovate The Majestic, a movie theater that had become derelict due to hard times. Bob Leffert, a veteran of the war who knew Luke, does not believe Peter is Luke, and fears Peter may be setting the town up for heartbreak, given they had lost sixty other young men during the war. Despite this, Peter helps to restore the theater, invigorate the town, and encourages Mayor Cole to display a memorial, commissioned by President Franklin D. Roosevelt after the war, that the town did not previously have the heart to display.

Meanwhile, Peter's disappearance leads House Un-American Activities Committee member Elvin Clyde to believe Peter is a communist, and he sends two federal agents, Ellerby and Saunders, to California to search for him, where they follow a lead about his car showing up on a beach.

When The Majestic shows his first movie Sand Pirates of the Sahara, and his screenwriting credit appears, Peter is jolted out of his amnesia. Harry suffers from a fatal heart attack before the reel change. After examining him, Doc reports that Harry's time is short. Peter cannot bring himself to acknowledge the truth, thus allowing Harry to die believing Peter is Luke.

After the funeral, Peter admits the truth to Adele, who had already suspected it. She supports his decision to tell the rest of the town. Before he can do so, federal agents Ellery and Saunders, as well as Leo and some police officers, arrive. When Sheriff Coleman asks if they need any help with anything, the federal agents reveal Peter's true identity to the whole town and issue him a summons to appear before a congressional committee in Los Angeles. During their meeting, Leo advises Peter to agree to reveal a list of other named "communists" in order to clear his own name. Later that night, the Majestic's usher Emmett admits that he knew Peter wasn't Luke after hearing Peter play a roadhouse boogie at the town festival, since Luke was more inclined to classical music.

The next day, Peter has an argument with Adele over this decision; she gives him a letter she received from the real Luke, as Peter boards the train to Los Angeles. On the train, Peter reads the letter, where Luke states his awareness that he might die in the war for a real cause, as well as a pocket-sized version of the U.S. Constitution and Luke's Medal of Honor.

Peter changes his mind at the hearing in Los Angeles, which is watched by all of Lawson on television. He confronts Congressman Doyle in front of the committee. Peter gives an impassioned speech about American ideals, which sways the crowd, especially when he holds up Luke's Medal of Honor, and this compels the lawmakers to let him go free. As Peter discusses the result with his attorney Kevin, he learns that the girl for whom he went to antiwar meeting in college was the very same person who had named him to the committee.

Peter attempts to return to his Hollywood screenwriting career, but finds he cannot deal with the ridiculousness of the studio executives' ideas, and leaves Hollywood.

After sending Adele a telegram, Peter returns to Lawson, fearing he will not be welcomed. Instead, he receives a hero's welcome from the town's citizens, who have come to respect him as an individual. Peter then resumes ownership and management of The Majestic, marries Adele, and they have a son together.

Cast
 Jim Carrey as Peter Appleton, a screenwriter who flees Hollywood after being accused of having communist sympathies; he loses his memory after a car accident and is mistaken for Luke Trimble, a soldier feared to be missing in action during WWII.
 Bob Balaban as Elvin Clyde, a member of Congress presiding over the Congressional hearing to interrogate Peter.
 Brent Briscoe as Cecil Coleman, the sheriff of Lawson.
 Jeffrey DeMunn as Ernie Cole, the Mayor of Lawson who is also a pharmacist.
 Amanda Detmer as Sandra Sinclair, Peter's movie star ex-girlfriend, who plays Emily in Sand Pirates of the Sahara.
 Allen Garfield as Leo Kubelsky, Peter's agent.
 Hal Holbrook as Congressman Doyle, a member of the Congressional hearing.
 Laurie Holden as Adele Stanton, the girlfriend of Luke Trimble and the daughter of Doc Stanton.
 Martin Landau as Harry Trimble, the father of Luke Trimble.
 Ron Rifkin as Kevin Bannerman, Peter's studio attorney
 David Ogden Stiers as Doc Stanton, the resident doctor of Lawson and the father of Adele.
 James Whitmore as Stan Keller, the elderly clock store owner who finds Peter on the beach following his car accident.
 Gerry Black as Emmett Smith, the usher and repairman of the Majestic.
 Susan Willis as Irene Terwilliger, the candy server at the Majestic and a music tutor.
 Catherine Dent as Mabel, a waitress at a diner in Lawson.
 Karl Bury as Bob Leffert, a one-handed veteran and diner chef who knew Luke Trimble.
 Brian Howe as Carl Leffert, the cousin of Bob Leffert.
 Chelcie Ross as Avery Wyatt, the owner of a hardware store in Lawson.
 Matt G. Wiens as Spencer Wyatt, the son of Avery Wyatt, who plays the clarinet in the town band.
 Daniel von Bargen as Federal Agent Ellerby, a federal agent searching for Peter.
 Shawn Doyle as Federal Agent Saunders, a federal agent searching for Peter.
 Mario Roccuzzo as Jerry, a bartender at a bar that Peter visits before his car accident.
 Bill Gratton as Daley
 Scotty Leavenworth as Joey, the kid who finds Peter's car on the beach.
 Earl Boen as Newsreel Announcer (voice)
 Bruce Campbell as Brett Armstrong, an actor who plays Roland the Intrepid Explorer, the main protagonist of Sand Pirates of the Sahara.
 Cliff Curtis as Ramón Jamón, an actor who plays The Evil But Handsome Prince Khalid, the main antagonist of Sand Pirates of the Sahara.
 Matt Damon as the voice of Luke Trimble, the soldier whom Peter is believed to be; his vocal cameo is heard as Peter reads his farewell letter.

Garry Marshall, Paul Mazursky, Sydney Pollack, Carl Reiner, and Rob Reiner provide vocal cameos as the unseen Studio Executives.

Production
The original script by Sloane had the working title of The Bijou, and was the title when Carrey signed on in August 2000.

The town of Ferndale, California provided many of the interior and exterior locations for The Majestic. The namesake theater was built as a false-front in the Ferndale municipal parking lot, and many Main Street buildings were modified by the film company.

Train scenes were recorded on the California Western Railroad in Fort Bragg, California. The lighthouse used was Point Cabrillo Light.

Reception

Box office
The film earned $27 million at the box office in the United States and another $9 million outside the US, which brings the worldwide total to $37 million. The film's failure at the box office was partly due to competition with The Lord of the Rings: The Fellowship of the Ring, Ocean's Eleven, Jimmy Neutron: Boy Genius and Harry Potter and the Sorcerer's Stone. The film was released in the United Kingdom on May 24, 2002, and failed to reach the Top 10.

Critical response
The Majestic received mixed-to-negative reviews from critics. On the review aggregator website Rotten Tomatoes, the film has a rating of 42% based on 144 reviews, with an average rating of 4.90/10. The website's critical consensus reads, "Ponderous and overlong, The Majestic drowns in forced sentimentality and resembles a mish mash of other, better films." On Metacritic, the film has a score of 27 out of 100, based on 30 critics, indicating "generally unfavorable reviews". Audiences polled by CinemaScore gave the film an average grade of "B+" on an A+ to F scale.

Kenneth Turan of Los Angeles Times commented that it was a "derivative, self satisfied fable that couldn't be more treacly and simple-minded if it tried".

One exception to this was Roger Ebert, who awarded the film three and a half stars and praised the film and its ideals: "It flies the flag in honor of our World War II heroes, and evokes nostalgia for small-town movie palaces and the people who run them... Frank Darabont has deliberately tried to make the kind of movie Capra made, about decent small-town folks standing up for traditional American values. In an age of Rambo patriotism, it is good to be reminded of Capra patriotism - to remember that America is not just about fighting and winning, but about defending our freedoms." Ebert also praised Jim Carrey's performance stating that he "has never been better or more likable".

Later Frank Darabont said:The Majestic is a movie I’m very proud of and I really love. It achieved exactly what I set out to make. And I find it very moving. But in your very magazine, somebody who praised the hell out of Shawshank said, “Frank Darabont needs to apologise for making The Majestic.” And I thought, “Really? What did I do? I need to apologise? Kiss my ass!”

See also
 McCarthyism
 World War II

References

External links
 
 
 
 

2001 films
2001 drama films
American drama films
Films about screenwriters
Films directed by Frank Darabont
Films about amnesia
Films about the Hollywood blacklist
Films set in a movie theatre
Films set in 1951
Films set in California
Films shot in California
Castle Rock Entertainment films
Village Roadshow Pictures films
Films scored by Mark Isham
Warner Bros. films
2000s English-language films
2000s American films
Films about disability
Films about lookalikes